The 1998 Indian Federation Cup qualification tournament was a football competition that was played among 37 teams to determine eight teams that entered the final round. These teams joined eight other teams that automatically qualified by virtue of entering the quarter-finals in the last edition. The qualification matches were played separately in five zones and the winner of each zone qualified automatically; with two from the South Zone. The runners-up of other four Zones competed in playoffs to earn the remaining two spots.

The first qualification match, played on 18 July 1998, was an East Zone match and Jorba Durga from the zone became the first team to qualify. The competition ended 23 August with playoffs when Punjab State Electricity Board eliminated Air India and became the final qualifier.

Qualified teams

Qualification

East Zone

Semi-finals

Final

North-East Zone

Quarter-finals

Semi-finals

Final

South Zone

Quarter-finals

Semi-finals

Final

West Zone

Quarter-finals

Semi-finals

Final

North Zone

The qualification process began with nine teams competing for one or two spots. JCT Mills qualified for the final round and Punjab State Electricity Board qualified to play the runners-up of other zones to qualify for the final.

Playoffs
There were two scheduled playoffs to determine the final two qualification spots to the finals. They were played on 20 and 23 August 1997.

See also
 1998 Indian Federation Cup

References

External links
 1998–99 Federation Cup zonal qualifiers
 Federation Cup 1998

1998–99 in Indian football